Howard "Monk" Johnson (April 4, 1894 – November 14, 1973) was a baseball left fielder in the Negro leagues. He played with several clubs from 1917 to 1926.

References

External links
 and Baseball-Reference Black Baseball stats and Seamheads

1894 births
1973 deaths
Lincoln Giants players
Newark Stars players
Pennsylvania Red Caps of New York players
Baseball outfielders
Baseball players from New Jersey
People from South Orange, New Jersey
Sportspeople from Essex County, New Jersey
20th-century African-American sportspeople